Ernest Holloway Oldham (September 10, 1894 – September 29, 1933) was a British traitor, employed as a cipher clerk in the British Foreign Office. He spied for the Soviet Union between 1929 and his death in 1933, in return for money. His job gave him access to highly sensitive communications between Britain and her foreign embassies, and the material he passed to his handler Dmitri Bystrolyotov was highly regarded in Moscow. He had no apparent ideological interest in helping the Soviet Union (unlike the more famous Cambridge spies), but was driven by the large amounts of money paid to him to betray his country. By 1933, the pressures of his activities had led to his sacking from the Foreign Office, alcoholism, domestic violence and ultimately suicide.

Despite hints to there being a spy within the Foreign Office by Soviet defectors Grigory Besedovsky (in October 1929) and Georges Agabekov (in June 1930), Oldham's espionage was only partly suspected by his employers during the last months of Oldham's life, when MI5 began their investigation and surveillance. His activities were uncovered in 1940 when Oldham was identified by the Soviet defector Walter Krivitsky during his interrogations with MI5.

He was found dead on 29 September 1933 at 31 Pembroke Gardens, Kensington, London, with his head in a gas oven, and although ostensibly a suicide, it is just as likely that he was killed by the Soviets.

References

Bibliography 
 The National Archives (TNA): Public Record Office (PRO) KV2/808
 Andrew, Christopher; Vasili Mitrokhin (1999). The Sword and the Shield: The Mitrokhin Archive and the Secret History of the KGB. Basic Books. 
 West, Nigel (1998; 1999). The Crown Jewels: The British Secrets Exposed by the KGB Archives. London: HarperCollins.

External links

 "Spies like us: The secret life of Ernest Oldham" UK National Archives Lecture by Dr Nick Barratt

1894 births
1933 suicides
British spies for the Soviet Union
Suicides in Kensington
Interwar-period spies